Empire of Light is the third full-length album by the English metal group Devil Sold His Soul, released by Small Town Records on 17 September 2012. It was the first studio album to feature Jozef Norocky on bass, and the last to feature Ed Gibbs as lead vocalist until Loss, prior to his departure from the band in April 2013 and rejoining in 2017.

Ed Gibbs eventually returned to the back in 2017, though the band are yet to release a full-length album since his return to the line-up.

Track listing

Personnel

Devil Sold His Soul
 Edward Gibbs - vocals 
 Jozef Norocky – Bass guitar 
 Paul Kitney – samples 
 Leks Wood – drums 
 Johnny Renshaw - Guitar
 Rick Chapple - Guitar/Piano/Organ

Additional Musicians
 Group Vocals by Tommy Renshaw and Devil Sold His Soul

Production

 Produced by Jonny Renshaw and Devil Sold His Soul
 Recorded, Engineered and Mixed by Jonny Renshaw
 Mastered by Alan Douches

References

2012 debut albums
Devil Sold His Soul albums